Vadapurampuzha River is one of the tributaries of the Chaliyar River. Chaliyar River is the fourth longest river in Kerala, south India at 169 km in length. It traverses through Nilambur, Mampad, Edavanna, Areekade, Vazhakkad and flows into the sea at Beypore in Kozhikode district.

References

See also
Chaliyar River - Main river

Rivers of Malappuram district
Rivers of Kozhikode district